Veronika Valiullovna Vakhitova (born 13 June 1998) is a Russian water polo player. She qualified for the 2020 Summer Olympics.

She was part of the Russian team at the 2017 World Aquatics Championships, 2018 FINA Women's Water Polo World League, and 2021 FINA Women's Water Polo World League

References

External links 

 
 US versus Russia July 5, 2021, Irvine, CA (William Woollett Jr. Aquatics Center)
 veronika-vakhitova, globalsportsarchive
 Water Polo - Day 8: Baku 2015 - 1st European Games

Russian female water polo players
Living people
1998 births
Sportspeople from Moscow
Volga Tatars
Tatar sportspeople
Tatar people of Russia
Water polo players at the 2020 Summer Olympics
Olympic water polo players of Russia
European Games gold medalists for Russia
Water polo players at the 2015 European Games
European Games medalists in water polo
21st-century Russian women